Kazimierz Sikorski (June 28, 1895 – July 23, 1986) was a Polish composer. His arrangement of the "Mazurek Dąbrowskiego" is currently used as the Polish national anthem.

Biography
Sikorski was born in Zurich, but studied in Warsaw, first music at the Warsaw Conservatory and then philosophy at the University of Warsaw. He then studied in Lwów, which was Polish at the time, and Paris. In 1926, he became a teacher of composition at the Conservatory of Poznań. From 1927 to 1945, he taught at the Warsaw Conservatory. He was rector of the State Higher School of Music in Łódź. From 1951 to 1966, he taught music theory and composition at the Music Academy Warsaw.  During this time, he was president of the Polish Composers' Union.

He received many awards and honours, including: the National Music Award (1935), the Order of Polonia Restituta (1937), State Award first and second degree (1951, 1955, 1964, 1966), the Award of the Polish Composers’ Union (1951, 1975), the Gold Cross of Merit (1952), Commander's Cross of the Order of Polonia Restituta (1955), the Banner of Labour Order, First Class (1960), the Jurzykowski Foundation Award (1981). He died in Warsaw, aged 91.

He was the father of the composer, Tomasz Sikorski.

Composition
Sikorski composed six symphonies, a symphonic allegro, two overtures (1945, 1954), some instrumental concertos, of which the clarinet concerto (1947) is the most important, a string sextet, three string quartets, choral and film music, including the music for the film Warsaw Premiere (Polish: Warszawska premiera), for which he won a State Award.

Selected works
 Symphony No. 2 (1922)
 Stabat Mater, Oratorio for 4 Solo Voices, Mixed Choir and Orchestra (1948, 1950)
 Concerto for Flute and Orchestra (1957)
 Concerto for Trumpet, String Orchestra, 4 Kettledrums, Xylophone and Tam-tam (1960)
 Poliphonic Concerto for Bassoon and Orchestra (1965)
 Symphony No. 4 (1969)
 Four Polonaises of Versailles for Strings (after Manuscripts from the 18th and 19th c.) (1974)

Selected filmography
 Warsaw Premiere (1951)

References

Further reading
Jarocinski, Stefan. 1965. "Polish Music after World War II". The Musical Quarterly 51, no. 1  (January): 244–58.
Thomas, Adrian. 2001. "Sikorski, Kazimierz". The New Grove Dictionary of Music and Musicians, edited by Stanley Sadie and John Tyrrell. London: Macmillan.
Thomas, Adrian. 2005. Polish Music since Szymanowski. Cambridge & New York: Cambridge University Press.

External links

Kazimierz Sikorski at PWM Edition

1895 births
1986 deaths
Burials at Powązki Cemetery
20th-century classical composers
20th-century musicologists
20th-century male musicians
Polish composers
Polish male classical composers
Polish music theorists
Academic staff of the Chopin University of Music
University of Warsaw alumni
Musicians from Zürich
Expatriates from the Russian Empire in Switzerland
Polish expatriates in France